Sashinka is a Canadian drama film, directed by Kristina Wagenbauer and released in 2018. The film stars Carla Turcotte as Sasha, a musician who is preparing for her band's potential breakthrough concert when her estranged mother Elena (Natalia Dontcheva) shows up on her doorstep.

The film premiered at the Festival du Nouveau Cinéma de Montréal in 2017.

The film received three Canadian Screen Award nominations at the 7th Canadian Screen Awards in 2019, for Best Actress (Turcotte), Best Editing (Jules Saulnier) and Best Original Song (Jean-Sébastien Williams, "Help Is On the Way"). It received three Prix Iris nominations at the 21st Quebec Cinema Awards, for Best Actress (Turcotte), Best Supporting Actress (Dontcheva) and Best Casting (Wagenbauer, Nolwenn Daste, Fanny Rainville).

References

External links
 
 Sashinka (version in French with English subtitles) at Library and Archives Canada

2017 films
Canadian drama films
Quebec films
2017 drama films
French-language Canadian films
2010s Canadian films